Thiocarlide (or tiocarlide or isoxyl) is a thiourea drug used in the treatment of tuberculosis, inhibiting synthesis of oleic acid and tuberculostearic acid.

Thiocarlide has considerable antimycobacterial activity in vitro and is effective against multi-drug resistant strains of Mycobacterium tuberculosis. Isoxyl inhibits M. bovis with six hours of exposure, which is similar to isoniazid and ethionamide, two other prominent anti-TB drugs.  Unlike these two drugs, however, isoxyl also partially inhibits the synthesis of fatty acids.

Thiocarlide was developed by a Belgian company, Continental Pharma S.A. Belgo-Canadienne in Brussels, Belgium. The head researcher was Professor N. P. Buu-Hoi, head of Continental Pharma's Research Division.

References

Antibiotics
Thioureas
Phenol ethers
Anti-tuberculosis drugs